General Motors is a disused railway station on the Orbost line in Melbourne, Victoria, Australia. It was previously served by Pakenham line commuter rail services, as part of the suburban rail system. It is located between Dandenong and Hallam stations, in the suburb of Dandenong South.

History

General Motors station was originally opened as a 'special platform' on 1 October 1956 to service the General Motors Holden car factory to the north. An alternate date for the opening is 18 November 1956. Construction of the station was paid for by General Motors.

The station opened at the site of a number of private railway sidings, two years after electrification of the line through it was commissioned, and at a time when suburban services to Pakenham did not exist. As a result, only a single platform was provided on the north side on the Down (Pakenham bound) track, and services operated as extensions of Dandenong trains at factory opening and close times. This was altered on 20 January 1975, when suburban services were extended from Dandenong to Pakenham. The Up (Melbourne bound) platform and footbridge to the north was provided in late 1974, and Pakenham trains were timetabled to stop at the station at factory opening and close times.

The station was provided with a crossover between the double track lines, and a signal box to control it. A number of railway sidings also branched from the station in a westerly direction along the main line. In 1979, they served the International Harvester, Heinz, and General Motors Holden factories. The station could not be accessed from public roads, with the only way in and out via a gate into the General Motors Holden factory.

In 1991, the General Motors factory closed down, leaving the station essentially isolated. A notice was issued by the Public Transport Corporation stating that the station was to close from 5 November 1991, however it remained open for a further eleven years, despite the closure and demolition of the factory, and the fact that the footbridge now led to a fenced-off, empty paddock where the factory had once stood. It was estimated to be the least patronised station in the entire city network, with only an average of 11 passengers using it a day. By the time it closed, only eight trains stopped at the station each day, four each way.

Visitors from the Signalling Record Society had to obtain permission from General Motors and be accompanied by a security guard while at the station. The Rail Appreciation Association Victoria was another group who organised a trip to the station, travelling via ordinary train services. Another group of railfans visited the station the last day of operation, again using regular trains.

The only means of accessing the station was to jump off the platform and cross over the tracks on foot, as no new access paths were built after the closure of the factory. This meant that it was one of only two stations on the Melbourne network to be inaccessible to wheelchairs (the other one being Heyington). The Public Transport Users Association argued that it should be upgraded due to industrial growth in the area, but M>Train, which operated the Pakenham line at the time, requested permission to close the station in 2002 due to "safety concerns and a lack of legal access". The last train stopped at the station at 4:42pm on 26 July 2002, and the station officially closed on 28 July.

Current status

Posters about the closure referred to a "temporary suspension". While M>Train did not rule out the possibility of re-opening the station at a future time, the M>Train network is now operated by Metro Trains Melbourne. In 2015, a spokeswoman for Public Transport Victoria said that there were no plans by either Metro Trains or PTV to re-open the station.

If the station is to be reopened, both platforms and the footbridge above the station will require repairs and resurfacing, while the building and other fixtures will have to be demolished and new facilities will need to be built.

In 2004, General Motors was still listed in the Pakenham line pocket timetable, and in 2005 the http://metlinkmelbourne.com.au trip planner was still displaying services to the station, despite the closure.

However, the station is no longer displayed on any public transport maps. In late 2004, all signage was removed, "KEEP OUT" signage was installed, and access to the footbridge between platforms was fenced off. Station announcements on the line continued to announce that trains would stop at "all stations except General Motors" until April 2007.

See also
List of closed railway stations in Melbourne
Redcar British Steel railway station, a similar railway station in the United Kingdom
Umi-Shibaura Station, a similarly-situated railway station in Tokyo

References

External links
 Signal diagram: Dandenong to Hallam and Lyndhurst 1979
 Photos: 'metf2nk' gallery
 Photos: 'Station pix by Somebody' gallery
 Photos: 'Victorian Railway Stations' gallery
 PTUA: Monty Python Bureaucracy Closes Railway Station
 Melway map at street-directory.com.au

Disused railway stations in Melbourne
Railway stations in Australia opened in 1956
Railway stations closed in 2002